Biyu of Baekje (died 455, r. 427–455) was the twentieth king of Baekje, one of the Three Kingdoms of Korea.

According to the Samguk Sagi he was Guisin's son, while other sources name Biyu as the illegitimate son of the 18th king Jeonji. It is not known which sources are right. (Since Guisin died young, it is likely that the stories about Biyu being Jeonji's son may be possible.) 

The traditional dates of Biyu's rule are based on the Samguk Sagi.  On the basis of more contemporaneous Chinese records, Best (1979) has suggested that the years 428 or 429–455 are more plausible. 

Within the Korean peninsula, Biyu sought to strengthen Baekje’s relationship with Silla, exchanging ambassadors in 433 and 434.  Although Silla was a protectorate of Goguryeo at this time, Silla and Baekje allied themselves against Goguryeo (Naje Dongmaeng Hangul :나제동맹 Hanja :羅濟同盟).

Family
 Father: Guisin of Baekje or Jeonji of Baekje
 Mother: unknown
 Queen: unknown
 Buyeo Gyeongsa (扶餘慶司, ?–475) – 21st King of Baekje, Gaero of Baekje.

See also
List of Monarchs of Korea
History of Korea

References

  Content in this article was copied from Samguk Sagi Scroll 23  at the Shoki Wiki, which is licensed under the Creative Commons Attribution-Share Alike 3.0 (Unported) (CC-BY-SA 3.0) license.

Best, J.W.  (1979).  "Notes and questions concerning the Samguk sagi'''s chronology of Paekche's kings Chonji, Guishin, and Piyu".  Korean Studies'' 3, 125–134.

Baekje rulers
5th-century monarchs in Asia
5th-century Korean people